The Dublin Christian Mission is the amalgamation of three older Missions located in Dublin, Ireland in 1965: the Dublin City Mission (founded 1828), the Dublin Medical Mission (1891) and the Dublin Mission (1953). It is the second oldest in the world.

In 1826, David Nasmith founded his first city mission in Glasgow. Two years later, Naismith founded the Dublin City Mission at Merchants Hall, Wellington Quay in Dublin, a similar organization. Other missions followed throughout Naismith's life, including one in London in 1835.

In 1879, the Mission relocated to Anglesea Street, constructing a main hall and a number of offices. By 1903, seventy five years after its founding, the Dublin Mission had eleven full-time missionaries under the leadership of Rev. J.C. Irwin.

In December 1939, the Mission once again relocated to newly built headquarters in Cashel Road, Crumlin, an area which had grown to some 13,000 residents in the past thirty years. This area was chosen because the Dublin Corporation had built some three to four thousand houses for working-class families nearby. Another factor came from a fall in attendance at the location at Anglesea Street as people migrated from the centre of the city. Crumlin Hall was later sold to the Brethren Assembly in the area. Some years after it was sold again to the Dublin Corporation, the current property owner.

Dublin Christian Mission continues services today, operating the largest independent Christian Youth work in the city of Dublin with over 300 young people making over 1,000 calls to the Youth Centre at 5&6 Chancery Place, Dublin 7. The homeless and hungry are fed at the drop in centre at 28 Pearse Street. Many of those attending for the food and clothing have a chaotic lifestyle of dependence on drugs or alcohol.

External links
Official website

City and Gospel Rescue Missions
Christianity in Dublin (city)